is a private junior college in Himeji, Hyōgo, Japan, established in 1974.

External links
Official website 

Japanese junior colleges
Educational institutions established in 1974
Private universities and colleges in Japan
Universities and colleges in Hyōgo Prefecture
Buildings and structures in Himeji